Racism in archaeology covers the phenomenon of interpreting archaeological remains in terms of speculations about the putative racial profiles of the peoples who created the structures excavations have brought to light. Archaeologist Chris Gosden wrote that "Racism occurs when judgements about people always proceed from their physical features of their body; when biology is given social force."

Such racial readings of archaeological remains have a history that may be traced back at least to Josiah Priest and his 1833 book American Antiquities.

Great Zimbabwe 

Great Zimbabwe is a medieval city in the south-eastern hills of Zimbabwe near Lake Mutirikwi and the town of Masvingo. It is thought to have been the capital of a great kingdom during the country's Late Iron Age about which little is known. Construction on the city began in the 9th century and continued until it was abandoned in the 15th century. The edifices are believed to have been erected by the ancestral Shona. 

In the mid-16th century the Portuguese historian João de Barros remarked with awe on the 'marvellous grandeur' of these ruins which far outstripped in architectonic genius Portuguese attempts to build castles in Sofala. He poured scorn on the idea any indigenous culture might have been capable of raising its masonry, commenting:
To say how and by whom these buildings could have been made is an impossible thing, for the people of that land have no tradition of that sort of thing and no knowledge of letters: therefore they take it for the work of the devil, for when they compare it with other buildings they cannot believe man could have made it.' 

The first excavation to be carried out at the site was by J. Theodore Bent who undertook a season at Zimbabwe with Cecil Rhodes's patronage and funding from the Royal Geographical Society and the British Association for the Advancement of Science. This and other excavations undertaken for Rhodes resulted in a book. Bent had no formal archaeological training, but had travelled very widely in Arabia, Greece and Asia Minor. He was aided by the expert cartographer and surveyor Robert M. W. Swan (1858 –1904), who also visited and surveyed a host of related stone ruins nearby. Bent stated in the first edition of his book The Ruined Cities of Mashonaland (1892) that the ruins revealed either the Phoenicians or the Arabs as builders, and he favoured the possibility of great antiquity for the fortress. By the third edition of his book (1902) he was more specific, with his primary theory being "a Semitic race and of Arabian origin" of "strongly commercial" traders living within a client African city.

The first scientific archaeological excavations at the site were undertaken by David Randall-MacIver for the British Association in 1905–1906. In Medieval Rhodesia, he rejected the claims made by Adam Render, Carl Peters and Karl Mauch, and instead wrote of the existence in the site of objects that were of Bantu origin. Randall-MacIver concluded that all available evidence led him to believe that the Zimbabwe structures were constructed by the ancestors of the Shona people.

Other reports arguing for an African origin followed but were controversial, as the white government of Rhodesia pressured archaeologists to deny its construction by black Africans.

Mound Builders 

The Mound Builders were members of various indigenous North American cultures who constructed earthwork mounds from roughly 3500 BCE (the construction of Watson Brake) to the 16th century CE. Geographically, the cultures were present in the region of the Great Lakes, the Ohio River Valley, and the Mississippi River valley and its tributary waters. Mounds and Mound Builders had been visited and painted since the 16th century but it was Thomas Jefferson who in the 1780s did the first excavation. He dug a three foot deep strata trench in an effort to determine the purpose of the mound, something not attempted in America before. His conclusion was that they were barrows, not monuments, temples or settlements as we now know them to be. He saw Native Americans as too uncivilized to survive on their own and eventually used force to assimilate them into American society.

A number of reports by French and English travel writers and colonists during the 17th and 18th century by writers such as William Bartram wrote about and illustrated the mounds, accepting that they were likely built by Native Americans. Irish historian James Adair wrote a book the History of the American Indians in which he acknowledged that they built the mounds, while at the same time arguing they were descended from a "lost tribe of Israelites.

It was in the late 18th century that the myth that a separate race of Mound Builders unrelated to indigenous groups had created the mounds. At the same time a spirit of nationalism was developing in the United States, and historian Nicholas Timmerman wrote that "The Mound Builder theories posited an explanation for the mounds that allowed them to account for the often-elaborate constructions they encountered as the products of a “civilized” race that had been overrun by a “savage” one."

In 1820 American archaeologist Caleb Atwater published his investigation into mounds along the Ohio River. His report followed archaeological principles of field work such as dendrochronology and stratigraphy. At the same time, influenced by the work of Constantine Samuel Rafinesque and a merchant named John D. Clifford, and argued that they were created by “a people far more civilized than our Indians, but far less so than Europeans” which he considered to be a lost race of Hindus.

In 1848 the fledgling Smithsonian Museum's first publication Ancient Monuments of the Mississippi Valley by Ephraim George Squier and Edwin Hamilton Davis, a major survey of sites according to apparent function, such as burial grounds, effigies, fortifications, and building foundations. It put forward what had become the common view of the time, that the Mound Builders were a more sophisticated race than 19th century Native American cultures. Suggested connections were to the Aztecs, Incans, Mayans or Egyptians.

Archaeologist Samuel Foster Haven was later commissioned by the Smithsonian to write for their "Contributions to Knowledge" series about the current state of knowledge of American archaeology. The Smithsonian published his "Archaeology of the United States" in 1856 which accepted that the mounds were built by "the aborigines of the country. 

The Bureau of American Ethnology published a study by Cyrus Thomas as its Annual Report of 1894. In it Thomas, who had begun by accepting the idea of a vanished race, argued that the Native Americans were not only capable but did build the mounds. This effectively ended the archaeological debate.

Today the archaeological consensus is clear - the various cultures that built mounds are descendants of the original settlers of the Americas. This has not stopped the myth from being spread. In a January 2023 an episode of Tucker Carlson's Fox Nation show "Tucker Carlson Today" had a guest who stated that "They didn't build 'em. Someone before them built 'em". Carlson replied "That's right" and saying there was "skeletal evidence of people who bear no genetic resemblance to the current Indians".

Josiah Priest and American Antiquities 

Josiah Priest's 400-page publication American Antiquities centered around his study of the Bible and antiquarian journals, supplemented by information from his travels. After visiting earthworks in Ohio and New York, Priest concluded that these mounds could be traced back to a lost race that had inhabited America even before the Native Americans. This idea is now referred to as the "mound builder myth". The book grew in popularity because of Priest's views on Native Americans. "It tapped into the widely accepted view of those times that Native Americans were merely bloodthirsty savages, bent on the destruction of all but their own race. It was inconceivable to Priest and like-minded men that a race so lazy and inept could conceive and build such huge, elaborate structures." Priest speculated that the original dwellers could be the Ten Lost Tribes of Israel. 

The reasoning Priest gives for his conclusion that there was an even earlier settler than the Native Americans relies upon his own interpretation of the Biblical flood story. According to Priest, after the great flood disappeared, Noah and his ark landed on America. While surveying the land, Noah also discovered mounds that had been constructed before the waters rose up. Upon seeing this, Noah questioned where these agricultural phenomena came from. "Surveying the various themes of mound builder origins, he could not decide whether the mounds were the work of Polynesians, Egyptians, Greeks, Romans, Israelites, Scandinavians, Welsh, Scotts, or Chinese, although he felt certain the Indians had not built them." Priest's racism has also been discussed in detail by author Robert Silverberg, archaeologist Stephen Williams, and author Jason Colavito.

Flinders Petrie 

Flinders Petrie worked closely with the scientific racists Francis Galton and Karl Pearson and over the years of his digging career sent bones, skulls and horses to their Anthropometric Laboratory at the University College London which led to him forming personal relationships with both. In turn his ideas on society were developed by their analyses of the biometric data. Historian Debbie Challis wrote that "Petrie was a prestigious advocate of Galton's anthropometric data gathering and racial science in understanding ancient Egypt and archaeological evidence, as well as a backer of Galton’s eugenic vision in contemporary society." Petrie argued that the culture of Ancient Egypt was derived from an invading Caucasoid "Dynastic Race", which had entered Egypt from the south in late predynastic times, conquered the "inferior, exhausted mulatto" natives, and slowly introduced the higher Dynastic civilisation as it interbred with them.

See also 

 Hyperdiffusionism
 Nationalism and archaeology

References 

 
Archaeology
Scientific racism
Racism